Cienfuegosia is a genus of plants, in the family Malvaceae and placed in the tribe Gossypieae.  Species can be found in central and south America, Africa including the Arabian peninsula.

They are typically herbs with woody rootstocks, or small shrubs, usually with conspicuous glands.  Leaves lobed or unlobed; stipules minute to large and leafy. Flowers are solitary in leaf axils or in 2-flowered cymes.

Species 
Plants of the World Online lists:
 Cienfuegosia affinis (Kunth) Hochr.
 Cienfuegosia angustifolia Krapov.
 Cienfuegosia argentina (Kuntze) Gürke
 Cienfuegosia conciliata Krapov.
 Cienfuegosia digitata Cav. – type species
 Cienfuegosia drummondii (A.Gray) Lewton
 Cienfuegosia gerrardii (Harv.) Hochr.
 Cienfuegosia hassleriana Hochr.
 Cienfuegosia heteroclada Sprague
 Cienfuegosia heterophylla (Vent.) Garcke
 Cienfuegosia hildebrandtii Garcke
 Cienfuegosia hispida R.E.Fr.
 Cienfuegosia hitchcockii (Ulbr. ex Kearney) O.J.Blanch.
 Cienfuegosia humbertiana (Hochr.) Fryxell
 Cienfuegosia integrifolia (Chodat & Hassl.) Fryxell
 Cienfuegosia intermedia Fryxell
 Cienfuegosia lanceolata (A.St.-Hil.) Krapov.
 Cienfuegosia rosei Fryxell
 Cienfuegosia saraviae Krapov.
 Cienfuegosia schulzii Krapov.
 Cienfuegosia subprostrata Hochr.
 Cienfuegosia sulfurea (A.St.-Hil.) Garcke
 Cienfuegosia tripartita (Kunth) Gürke
 Cienfuegosia ulmifolia Fryxell
 Cienfuegosia welshii (T.Anderson) Garcke
 Cienfuegosia yucatanensis Millsp.

References

External links

Gossypieae
Flora of South America
Flora of Africa
Malvaceae genera
Taxa named by Antonio José Cavanilles